Henry Inman (October 20, 1801 – January 17, 1846) was an American portrait, genre, and landscape painter.

Early life
He was born at Utica, New York, to English immigrant parents who were among the first settlers of Utica. His family moved to New York City in 1812.

Beginning in 1814 and continuing for the next seven years, he was an apprentice pupil of John Wesley Jarvis in New York City, along with John Quidor.

Career
He was the first vice president of the National Academy of Design.  He excelled in portrait painting, but was less careful in genre pictures. Among his landscapes are Rydal Falls, England, October Afternoon, and Ruins of Brambletye. His genre subjects include Rip Van Winkle, The News Boy, and Boyhood of Washington. His portraits include those of Henry Rutgers and Fitz-Greene Halleck in the New York Historical Society. He also painted portraits of Angelica Singleton Van Buren, Bishop White, Chief Justices Marshall and Nelson, Jacob Barker, William Wirt, Audubon, DeWitt Clinton, Richard Varick, Martin Van Buren, Francis L. Hawks, and William H. Seward.

Thomas L. McKenney assigned Inman, who was an accomplished lithographer, the task of copying more than a hundred oil paintings of Native American leaders by Charles Bird King to translate into a printed book, the History of the Indian Tribes of North America. The oil paintings are now in the collections of White House, the Joslyn Art Museum, Harvard Art Museums, and the Amon Carter Museum of American Art, among others. In the Metropolitan Museum, New York, are his Martin Van Buren, The Young Fisherman, and  William C. Maccready as William Tell.

During a year spent in England in 1844–1845, he painted Wordsworth, Macaulay, John Chambers, Sir William Stewart, Baronet of Blair and other celebrities.

At the time of his death, he was engaged on a series of historical pictures for the Capitol at Washington.  He was also president of National Academy of Design.

Among his pupils was the portraitist and still-life painter Thomas Wightman.

Personal life
In 1822, Inman was married to Jane Riker O'Brien (1796–1873). Together, they were the parents of:

 Mary Lawrence Inman (1826–1860), who married Smith Cutter Coddington (1812–1868) in 1844.
 John O'Brien Inman (1828–1896), who was also a painter.
 Mary Lucy Inman (1828–1907), who married William Vail (1815–1880)
 Henry Inman, Jr. (1837–1899), a writer who married Eunice Churchill Dyer (1842–1922) in 1862.

Inman died on January 17, 1846, after returning from England to America due to failing health.

Selected works

References

External links

 Art and the empire city: New York, 1825–1861, an exhibition catalog from The Metropolitan Museum of Art (fully available online as PDF), which contains material on Inman (see index)
 Gallery of Henry Inman's works, Art Authority 
 Henry Inman collection at the New-York Historical Society

19th-century American painters
American male painters
People from Utica, New York
1801 births
1846 deaths
American portrait painters
Painters from New York (state)
National Academy of Design members
19th-century American male artists